McClatchey is a surname. Notable people with the surname include:

Alan McClatchey (born 1956), British swimmer
Caitlin McClatchey (born 1985), Scottish swimmer
Richard McClatchey, American politician

See also
McClatchey Broadcasting, an American radio broadcasting company
McClatchy, an American publishing company